The Stanford Flipside is an undergraduate satire publication published at Stanford University.

History 
The Stanford Flipside was founded in 2008 by Jeremy Keeshin. The publication was printed as a weekly leaflet distributed to campus residences and dining halls. In 2012, editorial control was passed on and the paper remains run by students at Stanford.

Style and content 
The Stanford Flipside is known for its irreverent satirical humor. It publishes articles, standalone headlines, and puzzles.

See also 
 Stanford Chaparral
 The Stanford Daily
 The Fountain Hopper

References

External links 
 Stanford Flipside on Stanford publications
Stanford Flipside website

Satirical newspapers
Stanford University publications